Vuver is a crater on the surface of Uranus' moon Umbriel. It is estimated to be 98 km in diameter. The longitude and latitude of its center are 311.6° and −4.7°, respectively.

Vuver has a bright central peak, which is one of the few bright albedo features on Umbriel that noticeably stands out against Umbriel's low albedo.

The crater is named after Vuver, a Mari evil spirit.

References 

Citations

Sources

 
 
 

Impact craters on Uranus' moons
Umbriel (moon)